The War (stylized in all caps) is the fourth studio album by South Korean–Chinese boy band Exo. It was released digitally on July 18, 2017 and physically on July 19, 2017 by SM Entertainment under Genie Music's distribution. The album includes a total of nine tracks including the lead single "Ko Ko Bop". The War received the highest number of pre-orders at the time for a K-pop album, with more than 800,000 physical copies. 24 days after being released, it became Exo's fourth consecutive studio album to have sold over a million copies. The album was re-released under the title The War: The Power of Music on September 5, 2017. This was the first Exo release not to feature member Lay, who began an indefinite hiatus shortly before the music video for "Ko Ko Bop" was filmed, and the last album to be separately released in both Korean and Chinese language.

Background and release 
On June 15, 2017, it was confirmed by SM Entertainment that Exo will be releasing a new album sometime in mid-July. On June 23, SM Entertainment announced that member Lay would be unable to participate in the production and promotion of the album.

On July 8, Exo's official Twitter account was made public, through which SM Entertainment revealed the first teaser video for the album. Also on July 8, Exo 's official Instagram account opened by posting the three versions of Exo's new album logo. On July 10, the album's title was announced to be The War.

From July 9 to July 16, the album's track list was revealed one by one through a series of teaser videos each featuring one member. The album and its title track's music video were released on July 18.

SM started releasing teasers of the repackaged edition of the album with the message "The Power of Music". The first teaser titled #Total_Eclipse, which was the first seen during the teaser trailers of the group's debut, and their first song "What is Love", was released on August 21, 2017 at the same time as when the Solar eclipse of August 21, 2017 happened. The second teaser was released on August 28 titled #Parallel_Universe.

The third teaser titled "Power #RF_05" was released on August 30. On the same day, the title of the re-packaged album was revealed to be The War: The Power of Music and that it will be released on September 5, 2017 with 12 tracks including the title track "Power". SM started releasing teaser images of each member from August 30. On August 31, it was revealed that the album will include new three songs "Power", "Sweet Lies", and "Boomerang", along with the original nine songs of The War. On September 4, a poster of the repackaged album and "Power" music video teaser were released. The repackaged album and its three new tracks were released on September 5.

Promotion 
On July 18, Exo held a press conference in the morning where they expressed their gratefulness for achieving more than 800,000 pre-orders. Chanyeol commented, "I think it's an honor to be making new records throughout our lives. I want to say thank you." The group also held a live broadcast titled "Ko Ko Bop on One Night Summer" where they talked about the album and the music video shooting.

Exo started performing "Ko Ko Bop" and "The Eve" on South Korean music shows on July 20 and ended their promotions on August 13. Exo also performed their new songs in Hong Kong during the SM Town Live World Tour VI on August 5 and during the Music Bank World Tour in Jakarta on September 2.

On September 6, Exo held a mini fan meeting where they performed "Power" for the first time. The group started promoting the repackaged edition The War: The Power of Music by performing "Power" on South Korean music shows on September 7. On September 15, Exo also performed "Ko Ko Bop", "The Eve" and "Power" during Lotte Duty Free Family Festival in Seoul.

Singles 
The lead single "Ko Ko Bop" debuted at number one on the Melon Realtime Chart, making them the first K-pop group to enter the chart at the top after chart changes were implemented on February 27, 2017. The other album tracks debuted in the top nine. It was reported that multiple servers crashed, due to the number of fans streaming at the same time. "Ko Ko Bop" additionally topped 155 iTunes charts worldwide, including K-pop charts and general pop charts, as well as all-genre single charts.

"Ko Ko Bop" topped Gaon Digital Chart for four non-consecutive weeks. Exo also became the first male group to chart at number one on Gaon for four weeks. The song also ranked number one on the Gaon Monthly Chart for August, making Exo the first group in 2017 and the fifth boy group since 2012 to top the chart.

On September 14, Exo's song "Power" recorded the highest score of all time on M Countdown with 11,000 points, making Exo one of two artists to achieve a perfect score after the system changes were implemented in June 2015. The win also marks their 100th win on music shows.

Commercial performance

The War 
Prior to its release, The War received a record-breaking pre-order by retail outlets of 807,235 physical copies, making it the K-pop album with the highest number of pre-orders at that time. Within one week of its release, the album sold over 600,000 physical copies and became the best-selling album in one week on the South Korean album sales chart Hanteo, surpassing the record of 522,300 copies held by Ex'Act, Exo's previous album. The War topped the Billboard World Album Chart for two consecutive weeks, and the South Korean Gaon Album Chart for three consecutive weeks.

The War reached number one on iTunes in 51 countries in total, including in Canada, Hong Kong, Japan, Russia, Romania, Philippines, Taiwan, Ireland, Poland, Mexico, and more; 43 countries at the same time. Apple Music selected The War as "The Best of the Week".

According to Osen, Exo recorded album sales of approximately 1,012,021 copies in the span of 24 days, making The War the second fastest album in Gaon Chart history to achieve this milestone. Exo thus became quadruple million-sellers for having four albums with over 1,000,000 sales.

The War: The Power of Music 
The War: The Power of Music topped the South Korean Gaon Album Chart for two consecutive weeks. Additionally, the Korean and Chinese versions of the album debuted at number one and two respectively on the YinYueTai China Weekly Albums Chart.

The album reached number one on iTunes in 41 countries in total, including in Spain, Japan, Indonesia, Russia, Hong Kong, Finland, Denmark, Poland, Mexico, and Malaysia. The album also made it to the Top 10 on the iTunes charts in 67 countries, including in the US, Canada, Australia, Britain, France, and Germany. Additionally, the album topped Xiami Music's K-Pop chart.

Track listing 
Credits adapted from Naver

Charts

Korean and Chinese versions
Weekly charts

Monthly charts

Year-end charts

Combined versions

Sales

Accolades

Release history

References

External links 
 
 
 
 
 

2017 albums
Exo albums
Korean-language albums
Mandarin-language albums
SM Entertainment albums
Genie Music albums